Anatinellidae is a family of bivalves belonging to the order Venerida.

Genera:
 Anatina Schumacher, 1817
 Anatinella G.B.Sowerby II., 1833
 Pteropsella Vokes, 1956
 Raeta Gray, 1853

References

Venerida
Bivalve families